Mohamed Abid Soliman (born 20 August 1945) is an Egyptian water polo player. He competed at the 1964 Summer Olympics and the 1968 Summer Olympics.

See also
 Egypt men's Olympic water polo team records and statistics
 List of men's Olympic water polo tournament goalkeepers

References

External links
 

1945 births
Living people
Egyptian male water polo players
Water polo goalkeepers
Olympic water polo players of Egypt
Water polo players at the 1964 Summer Olympics
Water polo players at the 1968 Summer Olympics
Sportspeople from Cairo
20th-century Egyptian people